Assaf Cohen (born October 31, 1972) is an American actor.

Early life
Cohen was born in Mountain View, California and raised in Palo Alto, California, where his family settled after living for a number of years in Israel. He is of Yemenite, Russian and Israeli descent. Cohen graduated from the University of California, Berkeley with a BA degree in Integrative Biology. Foregoing earlier plans of attending medical school, he instead pursued professional acting.

Career
Cohen worked for a few years at regional theaters such as The Magic, Marin Shakespeare Company, Marin Theatre Company, TheatreWorks, San Francisco Shakespeare Festival, and PCPA Theaterfest.  He then next moved east and earned an MFA degree in acting from the Professional Actors Training Program at Rutgers University's Mason Gross School of the Arts, where he studied under New York Acting teachers William Esper, Maggie Flanigan and Deborah Hedwall. He later moved to Los Angeles, where he performed at theaters including South Coast Repertory and began his career in film and television.

Filmography

Film

Television

External links

 Official Website
 Hollywood Reporter: Cohen books USA pilot
 Twitter

American male television actors
American male film actors
1972 births
Living people
American people of Yemeni descent
American people of Russian-Jewish descent
American people of Israeli descent
American people of Yemeni-Jewish descent
People from Mountain View, California
Male actors from Palo Alto, California
UC Berkeley College of Letters and Science alumni
Rutgers University alumni